Sergio Bergonzelli (25 August 1924 – 24 September 2002) was an Italian director, screenwriter, producer and actor.

Life and career 
Born in  Alba, Cuneo, Bergonzelli graduated in Philosophy, then he started working as an actor with the stage name Siro Carme. After being assistant and second unit director in a number of genre films, in 1960 he made his debut as director and screenwriter  with Seven in the Sun. Also a film producer, Bergonzelli was the first to produce Spaghetti Western films entirely shot in Italy. In the 1970s he specialized in the erotic genre.

Selected filmography 
Director

 Seven in the Sun (1960)*
 The Last Gun (1964)
 Stranger in Sacramento (1965)*
 The Sea Pirate (1966)
 M.M.M. 83 (1966)*
 Colt in the Hand of the Devil (1967)*
 In the Folds of the Flesh (1970)
 Blood Delirium (N/A)*

 '*' denotes he wrote the screenplay

Actor

 Messalina (1951)
 The Bandit of Tacca Del Lupo (1952)
 La storia del fornaretto di Venezia (1952)
 I, Hamlet (1952) - Maestro di scherma
 The Blind Woman of Sorrento (1953) - The young Conspirator
 It's Never Too Late (1953)
 Una donna prega (1953)
 The Daughter of the Regiment (1953)
 Passione (1953)
 Cristo è passato sull'aia (1953)
 Terra straniera (1954)
 Gran varietà (1954)
 The King's Prisoner (1954)
 Farewell, My Beautiful Lady (1954) - The Student who gives a Speech (uncredited)
 The Violent Patriot (1956)
 The Most Wonderful Moment (1957) - Signor Mancini
 Et la tendresse?... Bordel! (1979)
 Pasiones desenfrenadas (1981)
 Tentazione (1988) - (uncredited)
 Sick-o-pathics (1955) - Neighbour #1 (segment "The Poor, The Flesh & The Bag") (final film role)

References

External links 
 

1924 births
2002 deaths
Italian film directors
20th-century Italian screenwriters
Italian male film actors
Italian film producers
People from the Province of Cuneo
Italian male screenwriters
20th-century Italian male writers